"Catch Me I'm Falling" is a song by Australian new wave and synth-pop band Real Life. Released in December 1983 as the third single from the band's debut studio album Heartland. The song is built on the success of the debut single "Send Me an Angel" and became the band's second top 10 hit in Australia, spending 27 weeks in the Kent Music Report top 100. It also hit no. 40 on the Billboard Hot 100 charts in the United States.

The song is about living one's dreams.

Music video 
At the beginning of the video the band members are wearing luminous glow in the dark face paint. The band performs the song in a bright room along with their respective instruments and then it is distributed among the members throughout the studio. In addition there are movie effects.

Track listings
7" single (WRS-006)
 "Catch Me I'm Falling" – 3:33	
 "Thrill Me" – 4:12

7" single (MCA-52362/ MCA 885)
 "Catch Me I'm Falling" – 4:02			
 "Exploding Bullets" – 4:09

12" single (RCA / WRST 007)
 "Catch Me I'm Falling" (Edit) – 4:10			
 "Exploding Bullets" (Extended Mix) – 5:38
 "Catch Me I'm Falling" (Extended Mix) – 5:52

Charts

Weekly charts

Year-end charts

Cover versions
 1984: Conny & Jean ("Hilf mir, ich liebe dich"/"Wege durch die Nacht")
 1984: Headliner (Thomas Anders)
 1998: At Vance
 2005: Novaspace
 2020: Topmodelz

References

1983 songs
1983 singles
1984 singles
Real Life (band) songs
Curb Records singles